Year 989 (CMLXXXIX) was a common year starting on Tuesday (link will display the full calendar) of the Julian calendar.

Events 
 By place 

 Byzantine Empire 
 Emperor Basil II uses his contingent of 6,000 Varangians to help him defeat Bardas Phokas (the Younger), who suffers a seizure during the siege of Abydos (threatening to blockade the Dardanelles). Phokas dies, ending the revolt and threat to Constantinople. Upon Phokas' death, the other rebel leader Bardas Skleros (who is captured and blinded) yields to Basil's superior forces.

 Europe 
 Summer – Charles, Duke of Lower Lorraine, captures the city of Reims by treachery of its new archbishop, Arnulf (the illegitimate son of the late King Lothair III). King Hugh I (Capet), demands that Pope John XV disciplines Arnulf. But John XV, not wishing to defy Empress Theophanu refuses.
 Winter – Theophanu arrives with her son, King Otto III in Rome to meet John XV. Crescentius II (the Younger) offers his submission to the Holy Roman Empire, in return for which she confirms his title as patrician of Rome.

 By topic 

 Religion 
 Council of Charroux: French bishops under the patronage of William IV, duke of Aquitaine, declare the first Peace of God (or Pax Dei). This agreement grants immunity from violence to noncombatants (peasants and clergy) who can not defend themselves.

 Art 
 October 25 – The Hagia Sophia at Constantinople is struck by a great earthquake, causing the collapse of the western dome arch. Basil II asks the Armenian architect Trdat, the creator of the Cathedral of Ani, to direct the repairs.

 Education 
 Sankore Madrasah, at this stage a mosque, founded in Timbuktu (modern-day Mali).

 Astronomy 
 September – Halley's Comet is at perihelion.

Births 
 September 5 – Fan Zhongyan, chancellor of the Song Dynasty (d. 1052)
 Adémar de Chabannes, French monk and historian (d. 1034)
 Al-Jayyānī, Arab scholar and mathematician (d. 1079)
 Chaghri Beg, co-ruler of the Seljuk Empire (d. 1060)
 Regelinda, margravine of Meissen (approximate date)

Deaths 
 January 23 – Adalbero, archbishop of Reims
 April 13 – Bardas Phokas, Byzantine general
 October 5 – Henry III, duke of Bavaria (b. 940)
 Chavundaraya, Indian general, architect and poet
 Chen Tuan, Chinese Taoist monk and philosopher 
 Choe Seungno, Korean politician and poet (b. 927)
 Fujiwara no Korenari, Japanese courtier (b. 953)
 Fujiwara no Yoritada, Japanese nobleman (b. 924)
 Glúniairn, Norse-Gael king of Dublin (approximate date)
 Gofraid mac Arailt, Norse-Gael king of the Isles (Hebrides)
 Kalokyros Delphinas, Byzantine general (or 988)
 Kiurike I, king of Tashir-Dzoraget (Armenia)
 Pan, Chinese princess and wife of Zhen Zong (b. 968)
 Sharaf al-Dawla, Buyid emir of Kerman and Fars (b. 960)

References